Vladislav Kaletnik (born March 24, 1995) is a Russian professional ice hockey forward. He is currently playing under contract with HC Lada Togliatti of the Supreme Hockey League (VHL).

Kaletnik made his Kontinental Hockey League debut playing with Metallurg Magnitogorsk during the 2014–15 KHL season.

Career statistics

Awards and honors

References

External links

1995 births
Living people
Admiral Vladivostok players
HC Lada Togliatti players
Metallurg Magnitogorsk players
Russian ice hockey forwards
HC Sochi players
Stalnye Lisy players
Yermak Angarsk players
People from Angarsk
Sportspeople from Irkutsk Oblast